The 2015 Emir of Qatar Cup was the 43rd edition of the cup tournament in men's football. It is played by the 1st and 2nd level divisions of the Qatari football league structure.

The competition features all teams from the 2014–15 Qatar Stars League and the top four sides from the Qatargas League. Four venues are to be used – Al Sadd Stadium, Al Arabi Stadium,  Qatar SC Stadium and Khalifa Stadium.

The Emir of Qatar Cup winner is guaranteed a place in the 2016 AFC Champions League.

Round one
Al Rayyan 5-0 Al Markhiya

Al Mesaimeer 2-1 Al Mu'aidar

Round two
Al Khor 4-0 Al Mesaimeer

Al Kharitiyath 3-3 (P) Al Shahaniya

Al Rayyan 2-1 Al Wakrah

Al Sailiya 2-0 Al Shamal

Round three
Al Gharafa 2-2 (P) Al Shahaniya

Al Arabi 1-4 Al Khor

Al Ahli 0-0 (P) Al Rayyan

Umm Salal 3-0 Al Sailiya

Quarter finals
Al Shahaniya 1-4 Qatar SC

Al Rayyan 1-5 El Jaish

Al Khor 1-3 Al Sadd

Umm Salal 0-0 (P) Lekhwiya

Semi finals
Qatar SC 1-2 El Jaish

Al Sadd 2-0 Lekhwiya

Final
23 may 2015

El Jaish 1-2 Al Sadd

References

External links
2015 Emir Cup, Soccerway.com

Football competitions in Qatar
Football cup competitions in Qatar